Millennium City may refer to:

Millennium City, Hong Kong, a group of buildings in Hong Kong
Millenium City, a shopping and residential complex focused on the Millennium Tower in Austria
The nickname of Gurugram, a city in State of Haryana in India
The nickname of Cuttack, a city in Odisha state of India
The nickname of DeCordova, Texas, a city in Hood County, Texas
Three cities awarded City status in the United Kingdom in the year 2000:
 Brighton and Hove
 Wolverhampton
 Inverness
A setting in the role playing games Champions and Champions Online
Millennium City incident, a scandal that occurred in Sri Lanka in 2002